Via della Lungara is a street that links Via di Porta Settimiana to Piazza della Rovere in Rome (Italy), in the Rione Trastevere.

History and name
In the 16th century, Pope Julius II opened the new via recta ("straight road") that cut through the open land south of the Vatican into Trastevere to join the Ponte Sisto, and continued all the way to the Ripa Grande at the southern edge of Rome. The original name of the street was Sub Janiculensis or Sub Jano, while the pilgrims coming to Rome to visit St. Peter's Basilica called it Via Sancta. It was later known as Via Julia, just like the street of the same name on the opposite bank of the Tiber, although Pope Julius II didn't create the street (this credit goes to Pope Alexander VI), but just adapted it.

Finally, the name was changed to Via della Lungara, that refers to its great length.

Monuments 
Since 1728, in Via della Lungara rose the mental hospital of Santa Maria della Pietà, an extension of the Ospedale di Santo Spirito. The hospital was enlarged in 1867 and then demolished during the building of the Lungotevere.

Religious architectures 
San Giacomo alla Lungara
Santi Leonardo e Romualdo
Santa Croce alla Lungara
San Giuseppe alla Lungara

Civil architectures 
Palazzo Corsini alla Lungara
Villa Farnesina
Palazzo Salviati
Prison of Regina Coeli

In popular culture 
Via della Lungara is connected to an ancient Roman adage:

It refers to the three steps giving access to the Prison of Regina Coeli: the adage means that an authentic Roman should have lived the hard experience of jail and then descended "the step of the Coeli".

Notes

Bibliography 

Lungara